Friedrich Wilhelm Gerhard (24 July 1884 in Trakehnen – 16 May 1950) was a German equestrian and Olympic champion. He won two Olympic medals at the 1936 Summer Olympics in Berlin.

References

1884 births
1950 deaths
German dressage riders
Olympic equestrians of Germany
German male equestrians
Olympic gold medalists for Germany
Olympic silver medalists for Germany
Equestrians at the 1936 Summer Olympics
Olympic medalists in equestrian
Medalists at the 1936 Summer Olympics
People from East Prussia